"Rollercoaster"/"Rough Boy" is the debut single from self-titled debut album by British band Northern Uproar. It reached number 41 on the UK Singles Chart in 1995.

Track listing
"Rollercoaster"
"Smooth Geezer"
"Rough Boy"
"Waiting On"

References

1995 singles
Northern Uproar songs